The Centre Furnace Mansion, is listed on the National Register of Historic Places and is the headquarters of the Centre County Historical Society, located in State College, PA. The Mansion, the ironmaster's residence for Centre Furnace, has been restored and is furnished to reflect the period of residency of ironmaster Moses Thompson and his family, 1842–1891. A mansion in miniature, identical to the original and scaled one inch to one foot, is on permanent display. This historic mansion and nearby iron furnace stack represent the 18th century beginnings of the charcoal iron industry in the central Pennsylvania area, and the 19th century beginnings of the Pennsylvania State University.

Centre Furnace site includes the Centre Furnace Mansion, furnace stack, and surrounding eight acres. This National Register site represents a small portion of the late 18th-century ironmaking village once located here. Its interpretation is based on historical documentation and archaeological research, and includes carefully landscaped grounds with walkways and period gardens.

The Mansion is home to various exhibits, programs, and fundraisers throughout the year.

Mansion Tours Hours:  1:00-4:00 p.m.  Sunday, Wednesday, Friday by reservation. Mansion Tours are free and open to the public; though donations are welcome (suggested $4.00).  A tour takes around one hour. The first two floors are handicap accessible.

The CCHS office is closed with no tours the week between Christmas and New Year's.

References

External links
 Centre County Historical Society

Museums in Centre County, Pennsylvania
Houses on the National Register of Historic Places in Pennsylvania
Houses in Centre County, Pennsylvania
Historic house museums in Pennsylvania
National Register of Historic Places in Centre County, Pennsylvania